Castel San Vincenzo is a comune (municipality) in the Province of Isernia in the Italian region Molise, located about  west of Campobasso and about  northwest of Isernia.  The Abbey of San Vincenzo al Volturno is located in its territory. It is also home to an artificial lake, created in the 1950s for a hydroelectric plant.

Castel San Vincenzo borders the following municipalities: Cerro al Volturno, Montenero Val Cocchiara, Pizzone, Rocchetta a Volturno, San Biagio Saracinisco.

People
 Albert N. Gualano  
 Sergio Vento

References

Cities and towns in Molise